Centaurodendron palmiforme is a species of flowering plant in the family Asteraceae. It is found only in Chile.

References

palmiforme
Flora of Chile
Critically endangered plants
Taxonomy articles created by Polbot